Chirognathus is an extinct genus of conodonts in the family Chirognathidae.

References

External links 
 
 
 Chirognathus at fossilworks.org (retrieved 7 May 2016)

Prioniodinida genera
Paleozoic life of Ontario
Paleozoic life of British Columbia